The Munich Public School District is a public school district in Cavalier County, North Dakota in the United States, based in Munich, North Dakota.

Schools
The Munich Public School District has one elementary school and one high school.

Elementary school
Munich Elementary School

High school
Munich High School (Cardinals)

References

External links

School districts in North Dakota
Education in Cavalier County, North Dakota